Serhii Palamarchuk is a Ukrainian paralympic swimmer. He participated at the 2016 Summer Paralympics in the swimming competition, being awarded the bronze medal in the men's 200 metre freestyle S2. Palamarchuk also participated in the men's 50 metre backstroke S2 event, being awarded the bronze medal. He participated in the men's 100 metre backstroke S2 event, being awarded the bronze medal.

References

External links 
Paralympic Games profile

Living people
Place of birth missing (living people)
Year of birth missing (living people)
Ukrainian male backstroke swimmers
Ukrainian male freestyle swimmers
Swimmers at the 2016 Summer Paralympics
Medalists at the 2016 Summer Paralympics
Paralympic medalists in swimming
Paralympic swimmers of Ukraine
Paralympic bronze medalists for Ukraine
S2-classified Paralympic swimmers
21st-century Ukrainian people